Primos station is a SEPTA Regional Rail station in the Primos area of Upper Darby Township, Pennsylvania. Located at Oak and Secane Avenues, it serves the Media/Wawa Line. In 2013, this station saw 322 boardings and 398 alightings on an average weekday. It consists of a pre-fabricated office trailer on one platform, and an open brick shelter on the other, and includes a 52-car parking lot.  Before becoming an established station, Primos was a flag stop known as Oak Lane.

Station layout
Primos has two high-level side platforms.

References

External links

 Primos Station | SEPTA
 Station from Oak Avenue from Google Maps Street View

SEPTA Regional Rail stations
Stations on the West Chester Line